Dino Kessler (born December 23, 1966) is a former Swiss professional ice hockey defenceman who last played for EHC Basel in Switzerland's National League B.

Kessler has participated as a member of the Swiss national team in numerous international tournaments, including the 1992 Winter Olympics.

References

External links

Living people
Swiss ice hockey defencemen
1966 births
Ice hockey players at the 1992 Winter Olympics
Olympic ice hockey players of Switzerland
EHC Basel players
EV Zug players
Genève-Servette HC players
People from Chur
Sportspeople from Graubünden